Afqu (also Romanized as Afqū and Afqūy; also known as Afkān, Aughān, and Owghān) is a village in Borun Rural District, in the Eslamiyeh District of Ferdows County, South Khorasan Province, Iran. At the 2006 census, its population was 95, in 43 families.

References 

Populated places in Ferdows County